The Man. The Music. The Show. was a concert tour by Australian entertainer Hugh Jackman. It showcased material from the soundtrack album, The Greatest Showman and Broadway and Hollywood musical numbers backed by a live orchestra. Comprising 90 shows, the tour visited North America, Europe, and Oceania. It began on 7 May 2019 in Glasgow and concluded on 20 October 2019 in Mexico City. The tour was officially announced on 30 November 2018, through the tour's website and is produced by AEG Presents, TEG-Dainty and helmed by Robert Fox.

The show was inspired by Classical Hollywood as well as the 2017 film The Greatest Showman with Warren Carlyle as the creative director, and Ashley Wallen as the choreographer. The tour featured costumes from Tom Ford, and an elevated stage with a runway and a round-shaped front. The central theme of the show was Hollywood glamour and extravagant style, and consisted of different segments, with each inspired by different topics. Inspirations varied from Broadway and Hollywood classic numbers to circus. The setlist had more than 20 songs picked from Jackman's career. Critics gave the tour generally positive reviews, praising Jackman's stage presence, vocals and his energy on stage.

Background 

Jackman's previous one-man shows including Hugh Jackman: Back on Broadway were critically praised for his vocal performance and stage presence and the album The Greatest Showman Soundtrack received widespread commercial success and earned him a Grammy award; It all led to The Man. The Music. The Show. tour which was announced by Jackman on November 29, 2018, via Twitter.
The tour is led by AEG Presents, helmed by Robert Fox and directed by Warren Carlyle. It is Jackman's fourth collaboration with Carlyle.

In an interview about the tour, Jackman explained, "Doing an arena show, for me, is perhaps the ultimate because of the amount of energy and excitement that you can create. Surprisingly to me, [...] you can create a special kind of intimacy."
He later clarified, "I want every night to feel like those people saw something that only happened that night [...] I've been on stage a lot over my life and I probably feel more at home there than anywhere."

Development 

The tour has been described as an 'extravaganza and characteristically theatrical spectacle' included songs from his musical career. Rehearsals for the tour commenced in January 2019 with involvement from the team of creative directors, producers, designers and choreographers. and the rehearsals occurred for 8 hours per day.

The title of the show was explained, "You know the man, you enjoyed the music and now you can see the show." Hollywood glamour and extravaganza were listed as the central themes of the show.
Inspirations for The Man. The Music. The Show. tour came from the film, The Greatest Showman, Broadway and Hollywood classic numbers and circus.

Jackman would 'get into different characters' — from Gaston and Jean Valjean to The Boy from Oz’s Peter Allen — when he performs their respective songs. "It’s a state of mind and a commitment and I think the audiences really enjoy the transformation." Jackman said.
Speaking to Billboard Jackman stated, "I’m going to do an homage to some of the great musicals. I’m going to dance like I’ve never danced before." and about the setlist, he told, "If I hear the intro to a song and don’t get a tingle, then I take it out. For me, it has to feel like, “I can’t wait to sing this song.” Because if I don't feel that, how can the audience feel excited about it?"

Warren Carlyle was signed as the creative director for the show, while Ashley Wallen choreographed the dancers through intricate dance steps. The large main stage was elevated and set up at the end of the arenas, with a long runway extending from its middle, the pathway ended into a round-shaped front. The tour featured costumes from Tom Ford including, a black snake-print velvet jacket, a metallic silver jacket and an  ensemble of white shirt with pleated bib, silk-satin cummerbund and black fedora.

Concert synopsis 

The show began with a video montage of Jackman's film characters, as Jackman ascended to the stage, clad in a silver tuxedo to sing "The Greatest Show" followed by a performance of "Come Alive". The show continued with "A Million Dreams", which included a sign language interpreter to translate the lyrics.

Commercial reception

Ticket sales 
General sales for the tour started from December 7, 2018. Prices ranged from $50 to $430. Tickets for the shows started selling out rapidly; due to the huge demand for tickets, extra dates were added for Glasgow, Manchester, Birmingham, Dublin and London.

Some of the UK cities sold out within minutes of being available, resulting in Aiken Promotions, warning buyers not to purchase tickets on the website Viagogo, a platform for third-party sellers, claiming, "There is no proof tickets appearing online actually exist." however Viagogo stated, "The tickets sold on our platform are genuine tickets that have been sold on by the original ticket purchaser in good faith."

During the North American leg of the tour, Jackman urged his social media followers to stay vigilant, after an alleged scammer set up fake social media profiles and some became embroiled in a ticket scam. Taking to Twitter, he revealed that fake accounts in his name are targeting his followers, promising meet and greets, to take money from them.

Boxscore 
In June 2019, Billboard announced the first boxscores for the tour, reporting the first leg dates. Total gross was $23.4 million with 289,586 tickets sold from 26 shows in Europe. The tour launched May 7 at Glasgow's SSE Hydro, where he earned $2.7 million across three shows. Jackman continued the trek through May and into June, where he posted sell-out finals at Amsterdam's Ziggo Dome (May 17; $783,000; 10,825 tickets), Zurich's Hallenstadion (May 19; $609,000; 6,313 tickets), and the AccorHotels Arena in Paris (May 22; $834,000; 10,566 tickets), among others. The leg finished on a high note with a six-show run at London's O2 Arena from June 2–7. There, Jackman grossed $7.4 million from 93,566 tickets sold.

Critical response

Europe 

Mark Fisher of The Guardian gave the concert a score of 5/5, and said, "The renaissance man’s song-and-dance spectacular skips merrily through Jackman's acting career with celebrity pizzazz and unashamed sentimentality." David Pollock of The Daily Telegraph gave it 4/5 stating, "The sense of natural showmanship that made him perfect for the role of PT Barnum was tangible, and – along with his raw, rustic baritone – it carried the evening." Paul Little of The Times reacted positively, saying: "[...]for Hugh Jackman, a combination of charm, being multi-talented and possessing leading man looks defines him." Natalie O'Donoghue of BroadwayWorld gave it 5/5, stating "Jackman is a born entertainer who had the 13,000 strong audience in the palm of his hand the entire evening." Steven MacKenzie of The Big Issue referred to the dramatic moments of the musicals saying, "Of all his formidable, envy-inducing skills, he is a truly great actor." Emily Heward of Manchester Evening News gave it 4/5, writing, "It’s hard to imagine any of Hollywood’s other leading men carrying off an all-singing, all-dancing revue with such charisma. Schmaltzy? Yes. Indulgent? Absolutely. But it’s also irresistibly good fun."
Ciara O'Brien of The Irish Times simply wrote, "He came, he tap-danced to AC/DC, he conquered." Francesca Steele of The Times gave it 5/5 saying, "Jackman has oodles of pizzazz and his charm filled the arena." Andre Paine of Evening Standard wrote, "The greatest showman, or a self-indulgent superstar? A bit of both, perhaps. But Jackman’s energetic arena show is supremely entertaining." Sophia Dellapina of Manchester’s Finest branded the show, "A colourful, wild, energetic, stunning hybrid of cinema, theatre, and music." and said, "Although I was slightly distracted by how great his bum looked for the duration of the concert, his dancing was yet another highlight- especially the tap dancing sequence." The critic of EILE Magazine said, "It was slick but had a sense of spontaneity, It was polished but personal." Calling Jackman "An old-fashioned hoofer, crooner and matinee idol."
Kate Goerner of TheatreReviewsNorth said, "Indeed you only have to look at the audience to see that here is a performer who appeals to all demographics. From girls' nights out to middle-aged couples to small children dressed up in ringmaster garb, it’s rare to see such a mixed bunch making up a 17,000 strong sell-out Manchester Arena audience."

North America 
Writing for the Houston Chronicle, Joey Guerra noted that "Jackman can sing and dance marvelously, to be sure. But he's also gifted with the ability to fully inhabit a character. It turned every song into a real moment." Ross Raihala from St. Paul Pioneer Press dubbed the show "campy and engaging" saying, "Jackman delivered the sort of old-fashioned, high-glamour evening of Hollywood spectacle that was once common on stage and screen, but is rarely produced at this level today." Jon Bream of Star Tribune branded the concert, "uncompromisingly ambitious, flashily entertaining and consistently uplifting." Gary Graff from The Oakland Press described the show as, "an arena-sized song, dance and video spectacular, extravagantly staged and delivered with an engaging, sincere exuberance that transcends its script." Barbara Schuler from Newsday reviewed the show at Madison Square Garden, saying "Jackman was captivated the audience with song-and-dance numbers, along with some lovely, intimate moments." Melissa Ruggieri from The Atlanta Journal-Constitution labeled the show "Jackman’s own Broadway spectacle" whose talents can "ably command the arena." Sarah Harris of Daily Herald wrote, "Jackman put on a thrilling spectacle and dazzled the arena with showmanship." Gil Kaan of BroadwayWorld dubbed the show "sensational" and said, "Utilizing his spectacular combo of sturdy vocals, fancy footwork, and multi-watt charm, Jackman owned the Bowl stage. He certainly knows how to work his audience into a frenzy, hitting all emotions." Naming Jackman, "The last of a dying breed: the all-round entertainer." Charles McNulty from Los Angeles Times wrote, "The two sides of his performing identity — movie star and musical trouper — came together in a homage to movie musicals. He knows how to punctuate a big number with an arm hoisted like a victory flag." Angelique Jackson of Variety stated, "The show is a wide-ranging experience overall, but the setlist feels cohesive because it’s personal, navigating Jackman’s history as a performer and showing off his eclectic musical tastes."

Set list 
Setlist from the concert on 7 May 2019 in Glasgow, Scotland. It does not represent all shows throughout the tour.

 "The Greatest Show"
 "Come Alive"
 "Gaston"
 "All the Way" 
 "I've Been Everywhere"
 "You Will Be Found"
 "Someone to Love"
 "Soliloquy"
 "This Is Me"
 "Valjean's Soliloquy/I Dreamed a Dream/One Day More"
Intermission 
 "The Boy Next Door"
 "Arthur's Theme (Best That You Can Do)/Don't Cry Out Loud/I Honestly Love You/Quiet Please, There's a Lady on Stage/I Go to Rio"
 "Tenterfield Saddler"
 "A Million Dreams"
 "Luck Be a Lady / Singin' in the Rain / I Got Rhythm / Steppin' Out With My Baby / Sing Sing Sing"
 "Nomad Two Worlds - Art Song"
 "Nomad Two Worlds - Inhibition"
 "Somewhere Over the Rainbow"
 "Mack the Knife"
 "From Now On"
 "Once Before I Go"

Shows

Notes

References

External links 

2019 concert tours
Hugh Jackman